The 2023 Valour FC season was the fifth season in the history of Valour FC. They played in the Canadian Premier League, which it co-founded and played in since the inception of both the club and the league. The club entered the Canadian Championship in the first round.

Background

In Valour's preceding four seasons, it never reached the play-offs, for which the top-four qualified in those seasons. The club ended in sixth place in the first two seasons and fifth place in the 2021 and 2022 seasons, missing the play-offs by one and nine points, respectively. The club's entry in the domestic cup competition, led to a single win over its previous four seasons. It was the club's second full season with Phillip Dos Santos as head coach, since he took over midway through the 2021 campaign.

Current squad
As of March 9, 2023.

Transfers

In

Transferred in

Draft picks 
Valour FC selected the following players in the 2023 CPL–U Sports Draft. Draft picks are not automatically signed to the team roster. Only those who are signed to a contract will be listed as transfers in.

Out

Transferred out

Pre-season and friendlies

Friendlies

Competitions

Canadian Premier League regular season

League table

Matches

Canadian Championship

Notes

References

External links 
Official Site

2023
2023 Canadian Premier League
Canadian soccer clubs 2023 season